Piret Bristol (born 18 April 1968) is an Estonian poet, prosaist, and novelist.

From 1986 to 2001, she studied Estonian literature in Tartu University.

From 1996 to 2007, she was a freelance writer. From 2007 to 2011, she was a copy editor for the newspaper Postimees. From 2011 to 2014, she was the head of the Tartu branch of the Estonian Writers' Union.

Selected works
 1996 short story "Turvamehed" ('Security Guards')
 2007 prose collection "Paralleelmeri" ('Parallel Sea')
 2011-2013 three-part novel series "Maailm, mis on hea" ('A World That Is Good')

References

External links
 Piret Bristol at Estonian Writers' Online Dictionary

1968 births
Living people
Estonian women novelists
Estonian women poets
21st-century Estonian poets
20th-century Estonian women writers
21st-century Estonian women writers
Estonian women short story writers
University of Tartu alumni